Paradrymonia aurea is a species of plant in the family Gesneriaceae. It is endemic to Ecuador.  Its natural habitat is subtropical or tropical moist montane forests.

References

aurea
Endemic flora of Ecuador
Vulnerable plants
Taxonomy articles created by Polbot